Springport may refer to:

Places 
In the United States:
 Springport, Indiana
 Springport, Michigan, village in Jackson County
 Springport Township, Michigan in Jackson County
 Springport, Alcona County, Michigan, unincorporated community
 Springport, New York

Other
 Springport Motor Speedway, Michigan